Romain Jacob (born 18 August 1988 in France) is a French professional boxer. He is a former EBU Super Featherweight champion.

Professional career

On 28 June 2013 Jacob defeated Martín Cardona by fifth-round technical knockout to win the IBF Youth Super Featherweight title.

On 14 February 2014 Jacob defeated Devis Boschiero by split decision to win the EBU Super Featherweight title.

Professional boxing record 

|-
|align="center" colspan=8|24 fights; 23 wins (7 knockouts), 1 loss
|-
| align="center" style="border-style: none none solid solid; background: #e3e3e3"|Res.
| align="center" style="border-style: none none solid solid; background: #e3e3e3"|Record
| align="center" style="border-style: none none solid solid; background: #e3e3e3"|Opponent
| align="center" style="border-style: none none solid solid; background: #e3e3e3"|Type
| align="center" style="border-style: none none solid solid; background: #e3e3e3"|Round
| align="center" style="border-style: none none solid solid; background: #e3e3e3"|Date
| align="center" style="border-style: none none solid solid; background: #e3e3e3"|Location
| align="center" style="border-style: none none solid solid; background: #e3e3e3"|Notes
|-align=center
|Loss
|23–1
|align=left|Juli Giner
|
|
|
|align=left|
|align=left|
|-align=center
|Win
|23–0
|align=left|Ermano Fegatilli
|
|
|
|align=left|
|align=left|
|-align=center
|Win
|22–0
|align=left|Devis Boschiero
|
|
|
|align=left|
|align=left|
|-align=center
|Win
|21–0
|align=left|Devis Boschiero
|
|
|
|align=left|
|align=left|
|-align=center
|Win
|20–0
|align=left|Edilson Rio
|
|
|
|align=left|
|-align=center
|Win
|19–0
|align=left|Martín Cardona
|
|
|
|align=left|
|align=left|
|-align=center
|Win
|18–0
|align=left|Leonus Marie Francoise
|
| 
|
|align=left|
|align=left|
|-align=center
|Win
|17–0
|align=left|Karim Chakim
|
|
|
|align=left|
|align=left|
|-align=center
|Win
|16–0
|align=left|Ravil Mukhamadiyarov
|
|
|
|align=left|
|-align=center
|Win
|15–0
|align=left|Samir Kasmi
|
|
|
|align=left|
|align=left|
|-align=center
|Win
|14–0
|align=left|Sylvain Chapelle
|
|
|
|align=left|
|align=left|
|-align=center
|Win
|13–0
|align=left|Sebastien Cornu
|
|
|
|align=left|
|align=left|
|-align=center
|Win
|12–0
|align=left|Richard Szebeledi
|
|
|
|align=left|
|-align=center
|Win
|11–0
|align=left|Maurycy Gojko
|
|
|
|align=left|
|-align=center
|Win
|10–0
|align=left|Youness Laribi
|
|
|
|align=left|
|-align=center
|Win
|9–0
|align=left|Michael Isaac Carrero
|
|
|
|align=left|
|-align=center
|Win
|8–0
|align=left|Mohamed Benbiou
|
|
|
|align=left|
|-align=center
|Win
|7–0
|align=left|Lubos Priehradnik
|
|
|
|align=left|
|-align=center
|Win
|6–0
|align=left|Fernando Guevara
|
|
|
|align=left|
|-align=center
|Win
|5–0
|align=left|Wladimir Borov
|
|
|
|align=left|
|-align=center
|Win
|4–0
|align=left|Stefan Berza
|
|
|
|align=left|
|-align=center
|Win
|3–0
|align=left|Sandor Fekete
|
|
|
|align=left|
|-align=center
|Win
|2–0
|align=left|Anton Glofak
|
|
|
|align=left|
|-align=center
|Win
|1–0
|align=left|Ladislav Nemeth
|
|
|
|align=left|
|-align=center

References

External links
 

1988 births
Living people
Super-featherweight boxers
Lightweight boxers
European Boxing Union champions
French male boxers